Dionne is both a modern feminine given name and a French Canadian surname. Antoine Dionne (1641-1721) of Quebec is the earliest known Dionne in North America, and currently all people with the surname Dionne are believed to be descendants of his.

People with the name include:

Given name
 Dionne Brand (born 1953), Canadian writer
 Dionne Bromfield (born 1996), British singer-songwriter
 Dionne Bunsha, Indian journalist
 Dionne Farris (born 1968), American musician
 Dionne Price, African-American statistician
 Dionne Quan (born 1978), American voice actress
 Dionne Warwick (born 1940), American singer

Surname
 Dionne quintuplets, Canadian quintuplets born in 1934
 Amable Dionne (1781–1852), Canadian politician
 Benjamin Dionne (1798–1883), Canadian politician
 Charles-Eugène Dionne (1908–1984), Canadian politician
 Charles-Eusèbe Dionne (1846–1925), French Canadian naturalist
 Deidra Dionne (born 1982), Canadian skier
 E. J. Dionne (born 1952), American journalist
 Georges Dionne (1876–1946), Canadian politician
 Gérard Dionne (born 1919), Canadian bishop
 Gilbert Dionne (born 1970), Canadian hockey player
 Ludger Dionne (1888–1962), Canadian politician
 Marcel Dionne (born 1951), Canadian hockey player
 Marcel Dionne (politician) (1931–1998), Canadian politician
 Maurice Dionne (1936–2003), Canadian politician
 Mónica Dionne (born 195?), Mexican American actress
 Rita Dionne-Marsolais (born 1947), Canadian economist
 Valérie Dionne (born 1980), Canadian water polo player
  Thomas Robert Dionne (born 1972), American Politician
  Todd Michael Dionne (born 1972), American Entrepreneur & Philanthropist

References

Surnames
Feminine given names
French-language surnames